Virginia Jaramillo is an American artist of Mexican heritage. Born in El Paso, Texas, she studied in Los Angeles before moving to New York City. She has exhibited in exhibitions internationally since 1959.

Education and early career
Jaramillo was raised in Los Angeles, California, where she attended the Manual Arts High School before attending the Otis Art Institute (now called Otis College of Art and Design) in 1958. She moved her family to New York City after the 1965 Watts riots.

Jaramillo's art has been primarily concerned with materials, and she states that "partly fuelled by her Mexican-American heritage," her "personal and artistic life has been a political statement." Her experiences led to her involvement in various feminist projects, such as the Third World Women issue of Heresies journal, and working on the board of the Feminist Art Institute.

Mid-career
Jaramillo was selected for participation in The De Luxe Show (1971) in Houston, Texas curated by Peter Bradley. The De Luxe Show was one of the first racially integrated exhibitions in the United States" and included artists such as Sam Gilliam, Kenneth Noland and Jules Olitski. During the 1970s she continued to exhibit. Group shows included participation in the Whitney Annual at the Whitney Museum of American Art in 1972. Solo exhibitions were held at the Douglas Drake Gallery in Kansas City, and the Soho Center for Visual Artists in 1976.

Later recognition
In 2011, Jaramillo participated in "Now Dig This! Art & Black Los Angeles" at the Hammer Museum in Los Angeles. In 2017 she was exhibited in "We Wanted a Revolution: Black Radical Women 1965-85" at the Brooklyn Museum in New York and in Tate Modern's "Soul of a Nation: Art in the Age of Black Power" (12 July–22 October 2017, London, UK).

Jaramillo's work is featured in the collection of Pérez Art Museum Miami. 

The Brooklyn Museum purchased Jaramillo's 1971 painting Untitled in 2017 through the Frieze Brooklyn Museum Fund. Initially produced for the 1971 De Luxe Show, at the time of auction this painting - along with three others by Jaramillo - had not been seen in 40 years.

References

1939 births
Living people
Artists from Los Angeles
Otis College of Art and Design alumni
American artists of Mexican descent
Artists from El Paso, Texas
20th-century American artists
20th-century American women artists
21st-century American artists
21st-century American women artists